Ayamy (Arabic : أيامي ), is a studio album by Amr Mostafa, and was released in 2007. It was his debut album, at first it was a success but then he had some disputes with Gamal Marwan the owner of Melody Music because he sold his melodies outside Egypt without his permission, Then the album stopped selling, it contains 12 tracks All composed By Amr Mostafa

Music video

Bartah Ma'ak was Track number 3 was chosen to be the music video for the album. It was directed by Jad shwery. It was aired on Melody Arabia music Channel

Track listing

Personnel

 Mostafa Aslan – guitar (track 1, 2, 3)
 Amr Mostafa – vocals, soloist
 Dimitri – guitar (track 5)
 Yehia El Mougy – violin (track 1, 4)
 Hassan El Shafei – arrangement (track 1, 4, 5)
 Kareem Abd El-Wahab – arrangement (track 2, 4,)
 Tamer El Zoaiby – mixing (track 1, 3, 4, 5)
 Khaled Fadah – photography
 Adel Hakki – arrangement (track 6, 7, 9, 10, 12), violins (track 9)
 Nader Hamdy – arrangement (track 3)
 Amr Mostafa – vocals, soloist
 Mohamed Mostafa – cello (track 8)
 Rocket – arrangement (track 8), guitar (track 6, 7, 8, 9, 10, 12)
 Ahmed Safwat – design
 Mohamed Sakr – digital master (all tracks), mixing (track 2, 11)
 Maged Sorour – kanun (track 1, 4)
 Mahmoud Sorour – violins (track 7)

References

https://www.facebook.com/amrmostafa

2007 debut albums
Amr Mostafa albums